NKT generally refers to the New Kadampa Tradition in Buddhism.

NKT may also refer to:
 NKT Holding, a Danish Industrial conglomerate
NKT Flexibles, a Danish company
 Nihonkai Telecasting, a Japanese television channel 
 Natural killer T cell, in cell biology